Somabrachys fumosa is a moth in the Somabrachyidae family. It was described by Oberthür in 1911.

References

Zygaenoidea
Moths described in 1911